Low Life is a collaborative album by Peter Brötzmann and Bill Laswell. It was released on May 12, 1987 by Celluloid Records.

Track listing

Personnel 
Adapted from the Low Life liner notes.
Musicians
Peter Brötzmann – bass saxophone, cover art
Bill Laswell – electric bass
Technical personnel
Martin Bisi – recording, Mixing
Thi-Linh Le – photography

Release history

References

External links 
 Low Life at Bandcamp
 

1987 albums
Collaborative albums
Peter Brötzmann albums
Bill Laswell albums
Celluloid Records albums